Michael "Mikey" North (born 27 September 1986) is an English actor best known for his role as Gary Windass in the ITV soap opera   Coronation Street since 2008.

Early life
North was born in the Cayton area of Scarborough and began acting at the age of twelve in productions locally around the town. He was noticed by an agent at the age of eighteen whilst acting in a play at Scarborough Sixth Form College.

Career
North's first professional work was in the play 'Bottle Universe' in London's West End, which won him the British Theatre Guide's award for the most promising newcomer. He also had small roles in The Bill, Britannia High, Waterloo Road and The Revenge Files of Alistair Fury, before landing the role of Gary, the son of the troublesome Windass family, in Coronation Street in 2008.

Personal life
North married Rachel Isherwood in 2016. They have two children.

Filmography

Awards and nominations

References

External links

English male soap opera actors
Actors from Scarborough, North Yorkshire
1986 births
Living people
Male actors from Yorkshire